Jules-Isaïe Benoît (October 22, 1830 – October 11, 1865) was a businessman and photographer from Lower Canada.

Jules-Isaïe Benoît, who was commonly known by the surname of Livernois, is important to Canadian history for his contributions and development of the photography industry in Quebec. His careful and highly skilled treatment of his craft preserved many aspects of cultural history in 19th century Quebec.

Photographer family
His wife and business partner, Élise L'Heureux, was also a prominent photographer. One of their six children, son Jules-Ernest (commonly known as Jules-Ernest Livernois, born 1851), followed in his parents' footsteps, traveling throughout Quebec taking landscape photos and outdoor group portraits.  In 1989, Jules-Ernest was one of four 19th-century Canadian photographers to be commemorated in the Canadian Photography series, marking the 150th anniversary of the first photograph taken in Canada, with a postage stamp issued by Canada Post.

References

External links
Biography at the Dictionary of Canadian Biography Online

1830 births
1865 deaths
Businesspeople from Quebec
Canadian photographers
Pioneers of photography
People from Longueuil